The Gorontalo–Mongondow languages are a group of Austronesian languages spoken in northern Sulawesi, Indonesia.

Languages
The Gorontalo–Mongondow languages are divided into two branches:

Gorontalic: Bolango, Buol, Bintauna, Gorontalo, Kaidipang, Lolak, Suwawa
Mongondowic: Mongondow, Ponosakan

Classification
Similarities between Mongondow and the languages of the Philippines were already recognized in the first half of the 20th century. Noorduyn (1982) presented phonological and morphological evidence for a close connection between Gorontalo and Mongondow, while the full extent of the subgroup including all other Gorontalic languages was established by Usup (1986). Blust (1991) has shown that the Gorontalo–Mongondow languages link up with many languages of the central and southern Philippines in the Greater Central Philippine subgroup. The following table exemplifies the close relationship, listing Greater Central Philippine innovations which are found in Mongondow (representing the Gorontalo–Mongondow languages) and Tagalog (the northernmost member of the Greater Central Philippine subgroup):

Reconstruction
The lexicon and phonology of Proto-Gorontalo-Mongondow has been reconstructed by Usup (1986). Proto-Gorontalo-Mongondow pronouns have been reconstructed by Lobel (2011).

See also 
Languages of Sulawesi
Minahasan languages
Sangiric languages

References

 
Languages of Sulawesi
Greater Central Philippine languages